Blackthorne may refer to:
Blackthorne, video game from Blizzard Entertainment
Blackthorne Publishing, comic book publisher
Blackthorne (band), American rock group
John Blackthorne, main character of the novel Shōgun and the later miniseries adaptation of it
Paul Blackthorne, British actor

See also
Blackthorn (disambiguation)

Disambiguation pages with surname-holder lists